United Nations Security Council resolution 1166, adopted unanimously on 13 May 1998, after recalling Resolution 827 (1993), the council established a third trial chamber at the International Criminal Tribunal for the former Yugoslavia (ICTY).

The Security Council was convinced that the prosecution of those responsible for violations of international humanitarian law in the former Yugoslavia would contribute to the maintenance of peace in the region. It also recognised the need to increase the number of trial judges and chambers at the ICTY in order to try the large number of people awaiting trial. 

Acting under Chapter VII of the United Nations Charter, the council established a third trial chamber at the ICTY and decided that three additional judges would be elected as soon as possible to serve in the new chamber. A list of nominations of between six and nine judges would be established. Finally, the Secretary-General Kofi Annan was requested to make arrangements to enhance the effective functioning of the ICTY.

See also
 Bosnian Genocide
 List of United Nations Security Council Resolutions 1101 to 1200 (1997–1998)
 Yugoslav Wars

References

External links
 
Text of the Resolution at undocs.org

 1166
 1166
1998 in Yugoslavia
 1166
May 1998 events